Yahalom (meaning "diamond" in Hebrew) may refer to:

 Yahalom (IDF), the elite combat engineering unit of the Israel Defense Forces Engineering Corps
 Yahalom (protocol), networking security protocol used to authenticate and interchange symmetric keys over a non-trusted network like the Internet.
 Operation Diamond, or Mivtza' Yahalom, an operation undertaken by the Mossad
 Yahalom (surname)

Hebrew words and phrases